Ashley Chijioke Nwosu (21 November 1957 – 21 April 2011) was a Nigerian actor. He was born on the 21st of November, 1954 in Abia State, Umuigu Oboro in present day Ikwuano Local Government Area in the southeastern region of Nigeria and he died on 21 December 2011 at a Military Hospital at Yaba, Lagos State, in the western region of Nigeria. He attended Umuigu Central Primary School in Ikwuano, Abia State where he got his First School Leaving Certificate. He proceeded to Oboro Secondary School at Ikwuano, Abia State where he got his West African Senior School Certificate.

He later gained admission into the University of Nigeria, Nsukka at Enugu State where he graduated with a Bachelor’s Degree in Zoology.

Filmography
Baby Guards (with Osita Iheme, Chinedu Ikedieze, Ufuoma Ejenobor and Amaechi Muonagor)
Okoto the Messenger
Nigerian Girls
A Man for Brenda
Genevieve
Stone Love
Hidden Secrets
Keeping Close
Young Masters (with Osita Iheme and Chinedu Ikedieze)

References

External links

2011 deaths
1954 births
Nigerian male film actors
20th-century Nigerian male actors
21st-century Nigerian male actors
Igbo actors
Nigerian male television actors
Actors from Abia State
University of Nigeria alumni